The Sloan Research Fellowships are awarded annually by the Alfred P. Sloan Foundation since 1955 to "provide support and recognition to early-career scientists and scholars". This program is one of the oldest of its kind in the United States.

Fellowships were initially awarded in physics, chemistry, and mathematics. Awards were later added in neuroscience (1972), economics (1980), computer science (1993), computational and evolutionary molecular biology (2002), and ocean sciences or earth systems sciences (2012). Winners of these two-year fellowships are awarded $75,000, which may be spent on any expense supporting their research.  From 2012 through 2020, the foundation awarded 126 research fellowship each year; in 2021, 128 were awarded, and 118 were awarded in 2022.

Eligibility and selection 

To be eligible, a candidate must hold a Ph.D. or equivalent degree and must be a member of the faculty of a college, university, or other degree-granting institution in the United States or Canada.  The candidate must have teaching responsibilities and must be tenure-track but untenured as of September 15 of the nomination year.  Only candidates with letters of nomination from department heads or other senior researchers are considered.  

The foundation has been supportive of scientists who are parents by allowing them extra time after their doctorate during which they remain eligible for the award.

An independent committee of distinguished scientists in each field selects the fellows based upon their research accomplishments, creativity, and potential to become leaders in their chosen field.

Since the inaugural class of 1955, 6,144 fellowships have been awarded, with faculty from the top ten universities representing over 35% of all fellows.  MIT counts the most fellows at 309, followed by Berkeley at 291, Harvard at 242, Stanford at 237, and Princeton at 236.

Notable award recipients 
Since the beginning of the program in 1955, 53 fellows have won a Nobel Prize, and 17 have won the Fields Medal in mathematics.

Sloan Fellowship recipients who became Nobel or Fields Medal laureates 

Notes

See also

 List of chemistry awards
 List of computer science awards
 List of economics awards
 List of mathematics awards
 List of physics awards

References

External links 
 Sloan Research Fellowships official site
 2015 Sloan Research Fellowships brochure

1955 establishments in the United States
Chemistry awards
Computer science awards
Economics awards
Mathematics awards
Physics awards
Alfred P. Sloan Foundation
Awards established in 1955